The Hastings and Manning, an electoral district of the Legislative Assembly in the Australian state of New South Wales was created in 1880 and abolished in 1894.


Election results

Elections in the 1890s

1891

1890 by-election

Elections in the 1880s

1889

1887

1885

1882

1880

References 

New South Wales state electoral results by district